Dolichoderus varians is a species of ant in the genus Dolichoderus. Described by William M. Mann in 1916, the species is endemic to Brazil and Ecuador.

References

Dolichoderus
Hymenoptera of North America
Hymenoptera of South America
Insects described in 1916